Luchinskaya is a rural locality (a village) in Argunovskoye Rural Settlement of Velsky District, Arkhangelsk Oblast, Russia. The population was 11 as of 2014.

Geography 
Luchinskaya is located on the Vaga River, 10 km northeast of Velsk (the district's administrative centre) by road. Palkinskaya is the nearest rural locality.

References 

Rural localities in Velsky District